The Cordillera Administrative Region (CAR;), also known as the Cordillera Region and Cordillera, is an administrative region in the Philippines, situated within the island of Luzon. It is the only landlocked region in the insular country, bordered by the Ilocos Region to the west and southwest, and by the Cagayan Valley Region to the north, east, and southeast. It is the least populous region in the Philippines, with a population less than that of the city of Manila.

The region comprises six provinces: Abra, Apayao, Benguet, Ifugao, Kalinga and Mountain Province. The regional center is the highly urbanized city of Baguio.

The region was officially created on July 15, 1987, and covers most of the Cordillera Mountain Range of Luzon and is home to numerous ethnic peoples. The Nueva Vizcaya province has a majority of Igorot population, but was placed by the American colonial government in the Cagayan Valley Region instead during the early 20th century, so do Quirino.

History

Background

Colonial era
During the Spanish occupation of the Philippines, Christianization and eventual subjugation of the mountain region proved difficult for the Spanish colonial government. Several comandancias were established by the Spanish colonial government in strategic areas of the mountain region. Among them were Amburayan, Cabugaoan, Kayapa, Quiangan, Itaves, Apayaos, Lepanto, Benguet, Bontoc, Banaue, and Tiagan.

On August 18, 1908, during the American regime, Mountain Province was established by the Philippine Commission with the enactment of Act No. 1876. Ifugao, which was part of Nueva Vizcaya province, and the former Spanish comandancias of Amburayan, Apayao, Benguet, Bontoc, Kalinga and Lepanto, were annexed to the newly created province as sub-provinces. Amburayan was later abolished in 1920 and its corresponding territories were transferred to the provinces of Ilocos Sur and La Union. Lepanto was also reduced in size and its towns were integrated into the sub-provinces of Bontoc and Benguet, and to the province of Ilocos Sur.

After Philippine independence
On June 18, 1966, Republic Act No. 4695 was enacted to split Mountain Province and create four separate and independent provinces namely Benguet, Ifugao, Kalinga-Apayao, and Mountain Province. Ifugao and Kalinga-Apayao were placed under the jurisdiction of the Cagayan Valley region, with Benguet and Mountain Province placed under the Ilocos Region.

Under martial law 

After the declaration of martial law by Ferdinand Marcos in 1972, the region became the focus of militarization as a result of local objections to the government's push for the Chico River Dam Project near Sadanga, Mountain Province and Tinglayan, Kalinga. Frustrated by the project delays caused by the opposition, Ferdinand Marcos issued Presidential Decree no. 848 in December 1975, constituting the municipalities of Lubuagan, Tinglayan, Tanudan, and Pasil into a "Kalinga Special Development Region" (KSDR), in an effort to neutralize opposition to the Chico IV dam.

Empowered by martial law to conduct warrantless arrests, the 60th PC Brigade had arrested at least 150 locals by April 1977, accusing them of supposed subversion and of obstructing government projects, and various other offenses such as boycotting the October 1976 Constitutional Referendum.  Individuals arrested included tribal papangat (leaders/elders), young couples, and in at least one case, a 12-year-old child. By December 1978, parts of the Chico IV area had been declared "free fire zones", no-man's-land areas where the army could freely shoot people without permits and animals.

On April 24, 1980, Marcos-controlled military forces assassinated Macli-ing Dulag a pangat (leader) of the Butbut tribe of Kalinga.  The assassination became a watershed moment, marking the first time the mainstream Philippine press could be openly critical against Marcos and the military, and building up a sense of Igorot identity that eventually led to Cordillera autonomy.

After the end of the Marcos administration due to the 1986 People Power Revolution, the succeeding government under President Corazon Aquino secured a ceasefire with the main indigenous armed group in the Cordilleras, the Cordillera People's Liberation Army led by Conrado Balweg. The Aquino government made a sipat or indigenous treaty, which would be known as the Mount Data Peace Accord, with the CPLA on September 13, 1986, ending hostilities.

Creation of the region
On July 15, 1987, President Corazon Aquino issued Executive Order 220 which created the Cordillera Administrative Region. The provinces of Abra, Benguet and Mountain Province (of the Ilocos Region), and Ifugao and Kalinga-Apayao (of the Cagayan Valley) were annexed as part of the newly created region. Nueva Vizcaya & Quirino were not included in the region despite having an Igorot majority at the time.

Modern history
On February 14, 1995, Kalinga-Apayao, one of the five provinces of the region was split into two separate and independent provinces of Apayao and Kalinga with the enactment of Republic Act No. 7878.

Several attempts at legalizing autonomy in the Cordillera region have failed in two separate plebiscites. An affirmative vote for the law on regional autonomy is a precondition by the 1987 Philippine Constitution to give the region autonomy in self-governance much like the Autonomous Region in Muslim Mindanao (now the BARMM) in southern Philippines. The first law Republic Act No. 6766, took effect on October 23, 1989 but failed to muster a majority vote in the plebiscite on January 30, 1990. The second law, Republic Act No. 8438 passed by Congress of the Philippines on December 22, 1997, also failed to pass the approval of the Cordillera peoples in a region-wide plebiscite on March 7, 1998.

At present, a third organic act of the Cordillera is in the offing supported by the Cordillera Regional Development Council.

Recent events

In September 2000, the municipal council of Itogon, Benguet, withdrew support for the San Roque Dam project. The project had met a lot of resistance, because of the reported failure of its proponents to update its Environmental Certificate of Compliance (ECC) and to submit a watershed management plan required for a project of that magnitude. The San Roque Dam was to become one of the biggest dams in the world and would threaten the living environment of the Igorot.

The Cordillera Peoples Alliance (CPA), an indigenous rights organization in the region, in co-operation with other organizations, had highly resisted this project and thus booked a little victory. In May 2001, however, President Arroyo stated that the San Roque Dam project would proceed regardless due to the fact that it had already been initiated and therefore was difficult to stop. At the same time, she promised not to sacrifice the environment, to rehabilitate the people who will lose their homes, to compensate those who will suffer, and to not initiate any more large-scale irrigation projects in the future.

In December 2000, the Supreme Court of the Philippines dismissed a petition that questioned the constitutional legality of the Indigenous Peoples Rights Act (IPRA), and act which came into existence in 1997 giving the peoples of the Cordillera decisive influence over the establishment of foreign mining companies. In this act, ownership over the lands was regarded as communal, rather than individual and thus coincided more with the view on ownership of the Igorot. The IPRA was totally different in tone than the 1995 Mining Code.

Without consultation from the people of the Cordilleras, the Mining Code gave companies the freedom to devastate tribal lands, allowed 100% foreign ownership, and gave companies the right to displace and resettle people within their concessionary areas. Some influential people filed a lawsuit with the Supreme Court against the IPRA, because it contradicted with the Mining Code and would therefore be unlawful. The petition was dismissed in a 7–7 vote by the Supreme Court.

A bill creating an autonomous Cordillera was filed in Congress in 2014, but it was not backed by strategic politicians in the region due to lack of support from the national government. However, in 2017, all provincial congressmen within the CAR jointly filed a new Bill creating an autonomous Cordillera, the first time in three decades where all provincial district representatives called in unison for autonomy. The move was made due to the election win of President Duterte, who publicly supported the creation of an autonomous Cordillera. However, questions lingered on the issue of Nueva Vizcaya's exclusion from the proposed region, despite being culturally and geographically part of the Cordilleras, leaving Nueva Vizcaya Igorots left out from the proposal.

Geography

The region is the only landlocked region in the Philippines, bounded on the northeast and east by the Cagayan Valley, and on the southwest and west by the Ilocos Region.

The region is primarily mountainous, positioned in the Cordillera Central mountain range, which includes Mount Pulag, the highest mountain in Luzon.

Within the region are several streams and rivers including the Chico River, which is a tributary of the Cagayan River. Other major rivers include

 Abra 
 Abulog
 Agno
 Ahin
 Amburayan
 Apayao
 Bued
 Siffu

Administrative divisions

Cordillera Administrative Region is politically subdivided into 6 provinces. It has 2 cities; the highly urbanized city of Baguio, and the component city of Tabuk. There are 1,176 barangays in the region. Geographically, the western half of Nueva Vizcaya is part of the main Cordilleras, while its eastern half is part of the Caraballos, the meeting point of the Cordilleras and the Sierra Madre. There have been moves to reunify Nueva Vizcaya with the Cordilleras, however, no such legislation has yet been introduced in Congress.

Regional divisions

Governors and vice governors

Cities and municipalities

Demographics

Ethnic groups

Cordillera is home to many ethnic tribes living on the Cordillera mountain range. They are commonly referred to as the Igorot.

Ethnic people of Abra
The Tingguians are composed of sub-groups known as the Itneg tribes which includes Adasen, Balatok, Banaw, Belwang, Binungan, Gubang, Inlaud, Mabaka, Maeng, Masadiit, and Muyadan or Ammutan.: Their places in Abra are as follows:

 Adasen — Lagayan, Lagangilang, San Juan and Tineg
 Banaw — Daguioman, Malibcong, also found in Balbalan, Kalinga
 Binungan — Baay-Licuan and Lacub
 Balatok — in the villages of Amti, Kilong-olaw, & Danak, all in Boliney
 Belwang — in the village of Dao-angan in Boliney
 Gubang — Malibcong
 Inlaud — Lagangilang and Peñarrubia, in Lumaba village of Villaviciosa, in the villages of Abang and Patoc in Bucay, in Langiden, San Isidro, San Quintin, Danglas (also found in some parts of Nueva Era)
 Mabaka — Lacub and Malibcong
 Maeng — Luba, Tubo and Villaviciosa, (also found in San Emilio, Ilocos Sur, Banayoyo and other towns in Ilocos Sur)
 Masadiit — Sallapadan, Bucloc and in the village of Sapdaan in Manabo, and in barangays Poblacion, Bawiyan, and Dumagas in Boliney
 Ammutan a.k.a. Muyadan tribe — in Manabo

Ethnic people of Apayao

 Isnag tribe — also known as Isneg comprising the sub-groups known as the Ymandaya and Imallod (Isnag refers to the people, while Isneg refers to the dialect). Isnags are found not only in Apayao but also in the eastern section of Ilocos Norte and northwestern portion of Cagayan. Their places of abode in Apayao are as follows:
 Ymandaya (Isnag) — Calanasan (Bayag)
 Imallod (Isnag) — Kabugao, Conner, Pudtol, and some parts of Luna (Macatel)
 Malaweg — Conner

Ethnic people of Benguet

 Ibaloi
 Kankanaey
 Kalanguya
 Karao Tribe

Ethnic People of Ifugao

 Tuwali
 Ayangan
 Kalanguya
 Ifannawer - Banaue

Ethnic people of Kalinga

 Tubog
 Banao
 Tanudan
 Tanudan
 Tongrayan
 Ifutfut: Fugnay, Ngifat, Lacnog, Tabuk
 Iterkaw: Nambaran, Tabuk
 Ifasao: Isla, Appas Tabuk
 Ichananaw: Lacnog, Tabuk
 Itongrayan: Luprupa, Ifunug, Amfato, Damsite, Tabuk
 Isumacher: Sumacher, Filong, Man-ufer, Mallango, Fangad, Madopdop, Lacnog, Ipil, Bayabat, Tannubong, Bulo. Tabuk
 Ylubuagen: Lubuagan
 Ipinukpuk
 Kankana-ey
 Bagbag-o
 Ifontok
 Ilocano

Ethnic people of Mountain Province

 Bontoc — Bontoc
 Balangao — Natonin
 Baliwon — Paracelis
 Applai: Bauko, Besao, Sabangan and Sagada

Languages
The region has been called "the most diversified ethno-linguistic region in the Philippines" with the many "sub-dialect variations" of its major languages.  This diversity has been attributed to the mountainous topology of the region. However, this did not lead to variations in "cultural development", and the majority of the people share a "similar cultural identity".

 Balangao, spoken in Natonin, Mountain Province.
 Bontoc, spoken in Bontoc, Mountain Province.
 Ibaloi, spoken in Benguet.
 Ifugao, spoken in Ifugao.
 Ilocano, spoken in Apayao, Abra, Kalinga, Mountain Province, Benguet, and Ifugao. It is the regional lingua franca.
 Isnag, spoken in Apayao.
 Itneg, spoken in Abra.
 Kalinga, spoken in Kalinga.
 Kalanguya, spoken in some parts of Benguet.
 Kankanaey, spoken in western Mountain Province and some parts of Benguet.

Religion
Like most other regions of the Philippines, Roman Catholicism is the single largest denomination in this region, however, a slightly lower (around 60–70% of the population) adhere to the faith, while Protestants, mostly Anglicans and Evangelicals forming a large minority at about 20–30% of the population. The traditional animist religions maintain a significant presence in the region and are still practiced by the tribal people.

Economy

Infrastructure

Roads and bridges
Apayao – Ilocos Norte Road – As a lateral road, the highway is a significant element of the Cordillera Roads Improvement Project (CRIP), connecting Northern Cordillera to the Ilocos Region. It traverses Apayao's Kabugao and Calanasan municipalities and turns west to Ilocos Norte's Solsona. This road project was started on January 7, 2013, and will be completed around December 2020.

Culture

The Cordillera region is known for its unique musical instruments including the gangsa kalinga, nose flute, bamboo flute, buzzer, bangibang, tongatong, diwdiw-as, saggeypo, and bamboo zither.
The region is also known for their dance, arts, and crafts like wood-carving, ibaloi basket, loom weaving, tinalik, loinclothes called ikat, amulets, tattoo, akob, bobo, suklang and ikat weaving.

The symbol of the tattoo of the Bontocs is about being brave (because of the pain while inking), a talisman or a good luck charm against evil forces, or a symbol of a status or position (ex. Chief captain, Leader, Mayor). They also use tattoos as a decoration and clothes to their body using arts by drawing or placing inks with a pattern or abstract on their skin.

It has been observed that the people in Cordillera make arts based on their emotions and belief. They use their talents in making arts and crafts as a source of income like wood-carving, basket-weaving, weaving clothes, amulets and ikat weaving. They have different patterns in weaving and they also have their own God that is called "Bulul", it is the God of the rice that is made and worshipped by the Ifugaos. Aside from their tattoo art, the Bontocs are also known for their excellence in making different baskets for storage and rice.

Tourism

 Banaue Rice Terraces which is part of the Rice Terraces of the Philippine Cordilleras (World Heritage Site)
 Cassamata Hill National Park
 Kabayan Mummies 
 Mount Data, Balbalasang-Balbalan National Park
 Baguio Sites which includes Burnham Park, Minesview Park, The Mansion, Lion's Head, Camp John Hay Philippine Military Academy, Bell Church, Wright Park, Baguio Garden, and Centermall

See also
 Cordillera Central (Luzon)
 Luzon tropical pine forests
 Cordillera autonomy movement

References

External links 
 
 
 

 
Regions of the Philippines
Luzon